The 2012 Women's Baseball World Cup was an international baseball competition being held in Edmonton, Alberta, Canada from August 10 to August 19, 2012.

Teams
The following 8 teams appeared at the tournament.

Round 1

Standings

Schedule

Round 2

Semifinals

7th place game

5th place game

Bronze medal game

Final

Final standings

External links
Official Website IBAF

References

Women's Baseball World Cup
2010s in women's baseball
2012 in baseball
Baseball World Cup, 2012
Baseball in Edmonton
2012
Women's Baseball World Cup
Sports competitions in Edmonton
2010s in Edmonton
Women's Baseball
Women's baseball in Canada